Carn na Nathrach (786 m) is a mountain in the Northwest Highlands of Scotland. It is located in the Ardgour area of Lochaber.

A very remote mountain, it takes the form of a rugged ridge and is usually climbed from Loch Doilet to the west.

References

Mountains and hills of the Northwest Highlands
Marilyns of Scotland
Corbetts